Tol Zari (also Romanized as Tol Zarī, Tall Zarī, and Tol-e Zarī) is a village in Komehr Rural District, in the Central District of Sepidan County, Fars Province, Iran. At the 2006 census, its population was 230, in 50 families.

References 

Populated places in Sepidan County